Type UC III minelaying submarines were used by the Imperial German Navy during World War I. They displaced  at the surface and  submerged, carried guns, 7 torpedoes and up to 14 mines. The ships were double-hulled with improved range and sea-keeping compared to the UC II type. The type had better seagoing, maneuvering and turning capabilities than its predecessor, while underwater stability was reduced.

A total of 113 Type UC III submarines were ordered by the Imperial German Navy, but only 25 U-boats were completed before the Armistice with Germany in 1918. Of those, 16 U-boats actually served in the war. 54 building orders were cancelled in 1918, while 34 U-boats were never completed and broken up in the ship yards.

Design
German Type UC III submarines had a displacement of  when at the surface and  while submerged. The submarines were powered by two six-cylinder four-stroke diesel engines each producing  (a total of ), two electric motors producing , and two propeller shafts.

UC III-class  boats were fitted with six  mine tubes, fourteen UC 200 mines, three  torpedo tubes (one on the stern and two on the bow), seven torpedoes, and one  SK L/45 or  Uk L/30 deck gun. Their complement was twenty-six crew members.

List of Type UC III submarines

Serving in World War I
There were 16 Type UC III submarines serving with the Imperial German Navy during World War I.

Completed after Armistice and surrendered to the Allies

Broken up at yard

See also

References

Citations

Bibliography

Submarine classes
 
World War I submarines of Germany
World War I minelayers of Germany